Thunderbird Park was a baseball venue in Cedar City, Utah, United States.  It was home to the Southern Utah Thunderbirds baseball team. As part of the athletic program's move to the Big Sky Conference for the 2012–2013 season, Southern Utah's baseball program was discontinued. The venue had a capacity of 500 spectators.

Following the 2012 season, the baseball venue was demolished, and the area was converted to a soccer field.

References 

College baseball venues in the United States
Baseball venues in Utah
Southern Utah Thunderbirds baseball
Buildings and structures in Cedar City, Utah